Canberra High School is a years 7–10 public co-educational high school in Macquarie, Canberra, Australian Capital Territory, Australia. It was established in 1938.

History 

Canberra High School was established in 1938 and was previously situated in central Canberra. The former school buildings are now the home of the Australian National University School of Arts.

Curriculum 
Students may enter subjects including L.O.T.E. (Languages Other Than English), the Arts (Dance, Drama, Music, Photography and Art), Technology (Food Technology, Workshop Technology, Graphics, and Textiles) and Information technology (Robotronics and Programming). They also offer challenge groups for gifted and talented students as part of their INSPIRE (gifted and talented program), a number school bands of sporting teams, and a debating team. Maths, Science, English, SOSE (Studies of Society and Environment) and PE are all compulsory in compliance to the National Curriculum.

References

External links 
 

High schools in the Australian Capital Territory
Public schools in the Australian Capital Territory
Educational institutions established in 1938
1938 establishments in Australia